William Eric Houghton (29 June 1910 – 1 May 1996) was an English footballer and manager.

Eric Houghton was born in Billingborough, Lincolnshire and educated at Donington Grammar School. He signed for Aston Villa as a seventeen-year-old and played in the Villa side for two decades, scoring 170 goals in 392 games. (The total including wartime matches was over 200 goals.) He also won 7 caps for England. His formidable and powerful shot was regarded as the hardest shot of his era. Houghton converted 58 spot kicks and also scored direct from about 30 free-kicks. He is often referred to as 'Mr Aston Villa' in recognition of his long standing service and contribution to the club.

Houghton scored 30 goals in the 1930-31 season, in which Villa scored 128 league goals, a First Division record.

Houghton finished his playing career at Notts County.

After managing Notts County, he went on to become Aston Villa manager, guiding Villa to a record seventh FA Cup triumph in 1957. He later returned to Villa as a director, the only person to do this at the club. He had 4 children. In 2006 the club announced the creation of an Aston Villa Hall of Fame. This was voted for by fans and the inaugural induction saw 12 former players, managers and directors named. Eric Houghton was chosen. 

He also played seven first-class matches as a right-handed batsman and a right-arm bowler for Warwickshire County Cricket Club (1946–1947) and also minor counties cricket for Lincolnshire County Cricket Club. He also played club cricket for Sleaford, Aston Unity and Olton Cricket Clubs.

His brother, Roy Houghton, and cousin, Reg Goodacre, were also footballers. His son Neil chaired Warwickshire County Cricket Club (2003-2011) and his great-nephew Chris Woods was a successful international footballer.

He died in Sutton Coldfield on 1 May 1996, aged 85.

References

External links 
 Eric Houghton at Cricket Archive
 Eric Houghton at Cricinfo
 Eric Houghton football career statistics

1910 births
1996 deaths
People from Billingborough
English footballers
England international footballers
Aston Villa F.C. players
English football managers
Aston Villa F.C. managers
Notts County F.C. managers
English cricketers
Warwickshire cricketers
Lincolnshire cricketers
English Football League players
English Football League representative players
English Football League managers
Association football wingers
Brentford F.C. wartime guest players
Notts County F.C. players
Footballers from Lincolnshire
Aston Villa F.C. directors and chairmen